Imam Tantowi (born 13 August 1946) is an Indonesian film director and screenwriter. Tantowi was a stage director before he began to work in film, first as artistic director and later as assistant director. In 1982 he was given the opportunity to direct his first film, Pasukan Berani Mati (Ready-to-Die Force). In a career spanning six decades he has directed 18 feature films and written more than 30 scripts for the screen and for television.

Tantowi won the Citra Award for Best Original Screenplay at the 1989 Indonesian Film Festival for his film . At the 1991 Indonesian Film Festival he won the Best Director award for his film Soerabaia 45. He won the Vidia Award at the 1996 Festival Sinetron Indonesia for his television series .

Filmography

As director

Film 
 Pasukan Berani Mati (1982)
  (1983)
 Dia Sang Penakluk (1984)
  (1985)
 Residivis (1985)
 Teroris (1986)
 Kelabang Seribu (1986)
  (1986)
 Siluman Serigala Putih (1987)
  (1987)
  (1988)
  (1988)
  (1989)
 Soerabaia 45 (1989)
  (1991)
  (1997)

As screenwriter

Film 
 Ira Maya dan Kakek Ateng (1979)
 Nakalnya Anak-anak (1980)
 Primitif (1980)
 Jaka Sembung (1981)
 Ratu Ilmu Hitam (1981)
 Pasukan Berani Mati (1982)
 Lebak Membara (1982)
 Jaka Sembung dan Bajing Ireng (1983)
 Dia Sang Penakluk (1984)
 Residivis (1985)
 Preman (1985)
 Teroris (1986)
 Kelabang Seribu (1986)
  (1986)
 Siluman Serigala Putih (1987)
 Saur Sepuh 1 (1987)
 Saur Sepuh 2 (1988)
 Saur Sepuh 3 (1988)
 Soerabaia 45 (1989)
 Saur Sepuh 4 (1991)
 Tukang Bubur Naik Haji: Mahakasih (1996)

Soaps 
 Madu Racun dan Anak Singkong
 Jejak Sang Guru
 
 Bang Jagur
 Bintang Film
  (2009)
  (2009)
 Tukang Bubur Naik Haji The Series (2012)
  (2013)
  (2014)

Bibliography

References

External links 
 Film Indonesia: Imam Tantowi Biography 
 
 

1946 births
Living people
Indonesian film directors
Indonesian screenwriters
Citra Award winners
People from Tegal